"Ölürüm Sana"  (English "I'd Die For You") was recorded in 1997 by Tarkan, named after the similarly named song Ölürüm Sana that is featured in the album. Its most popular song was "Şımarık", also known as "Kiss Kiss" in some countries. It sold more than 4.5 million copies worldwide, including 3 million sales in Turkey. "Şımarık", whose music and lyrics were both composed by Tarkan, found its place at number 1 in the Billboard Turkish Top 20 List of that year.

Music video
"Ölürüm Sana" was released by Tarkan in 1997, and is the album's third song. The video clip was taken in New York and was sponsored by Loft.

Tag 
 Regulation: Ozan Çolakoğlu
 Electric guitar: Erdem Sökmen
 Percussion: Aydın Karabulut
 Bass guitar: James Cruz
 Costume: Bahar Korçan

References

External links
 Tarkan official website

1997 songs
Tarkan (singer) songs
1998 singles
Ultratop 50 Singles (Wallonia) number-one singles
Songs written by Tarkan (singer)
Turkish-language songs